The 2017 Schleswig-Holstein state election was held on 7 May 2017 to elect the members of the Landtag of Schleswig-Holstein. The incumbent government was led by Minister-President Torsten Albig, and consisted of the Social Democratic Party (SPD), The Greens, and the South Schleswig Voters' Association (SSW). The government lost its majority in the election.

The Christian Democratic Union (CDU) subsequently formed a Jamaica coalition with the Free Democratic Party (FDP) and Greens. CDU leader Daniel Günther was elected Minister-President by the Landtag, and Günther cabinet was sworn into office.

Parties
The table below lists parties represented in the previous Landtag of Schleswig-Holstein.

Opinion polling

Election result

|-
| colspan=8| 
|-
! colspan="2" | Party
! Votes
! %
! +/-
! Seats 
! +/-
! Seats %
|-
| bgcolor=| 
| align=left | Christian Democratic Union (CDU)
| align=right| 471,460
| align=right| 32.0
| align=right| 1.2
| align=right| 25
| align=right| 3
| align=right| 34.2
|-
| bgcolor=| 
| align=left | Social Democratic Party (SPD)
| align=right| 401,806
| align=right| 27.3
| align=right| 3.1
| align=right| 21
| align=right| 1
| align=right| 28.8
|-
| bgcolor=| 
| align=left | Alliance 90/The Greens (Grüne)
| align=right| 190,181
| align=right| 12.9
| align=right| 0.3
| align=right| 10
| align=right| 0
| align=right| 13.7
|-
| bgcolor=| 
| align=left | Free Democratic Party (FDP)
| align=right| 169,037
| align=right| 11.5
| align=right| 3.3
| align=right| 9
| align=right| 3
| align=right| 12.3
|-
| bgcolor=| 
| align=left | Alternative for Germany (AfD)
| align=right| 86,711
| align=right| 5.9
| align=right| New
| align=right| 5
| align=right| New
| align=right| 6.8
|-
| bgcolor=| 
| align=left | South Schleswig Voters' Association (SSW)
| align=right| 48,968
| align=right| 3.3
| align=right| 1.3
| align=right| 3
| align=right| 0
| align=right| 4.1
|-
! colspan=8|
|-
| bgcolor=| 
| align=left | The Left (Linke)
| align=right| 56,018
| align=right| 3.8
| align=right| 1.5
| align=right| 0
| align=right| ±0
| align=right| 0
|-
| bgcolor=| 
| align=left | Pirate Party Germany (Piraten)
| align=right| 17,091
| align=right| 1.2
| align=right| 7.0
| align=right| 0
| align=right| 6
| align=right| 0
|-
| bgcolor=|
| align=left | Others
| align=right| 33,236
| align=right| 2.3
| align=right| 
| align=right| 0
| align=right| ±0
| align=right| 0
|-
! align=right colspan=2| Total
! align=right| 1,474,508
! align=right| 100.0
! align=right| 
! align=right| 73
! align=right| 4
! align=right| 
|-
! align=right colspan=2| Voter turnout
! align=right| 
! align=right| 64.2
! align=right| 4.0
! align=right| 
! align=right| 
! align=right| 
|}

Results by constituency
First votes ("Erststimmen") by constituency

Results by age group
Second votes ("Zweitstimmen") by age group

References

External links
 Polling at wahlrecht.de

2017 elections in Germany
Elections in Schleswig-Holstein
May 2017 events in Germany